Government T D Medical College, Alappuzha is a government medical colleges situated in the suburban area of Vandanam,  south of the Alappuzha (previously Alleppey city), facing the NH 66, in Alappuzha district of Kerala State, South India. The initials T.D. stand for Thirumala Devaswom (Sanskrit: "belonging to the Lord of Thirumala"), as the Medical College was started in 1963 under the patronage of the T.D. Temple at Anantha Narayana Puram of Alappuzha.The founder of T.D.Medical College is Sri. N.V.Prabhu aka Narayana Venkateshwara Prabhu, a great personality hailing from Alappuzha. The emblem of the college, designed by Sri.N.V.Prabhu shows the Hindu god Narasimha (man lion), on top as the college was first under the TD trust The first batch of MBBS classes were started in August 1963 for 50 students. The Kerala government had agreed to upgrade the district headquarters hospital at Alappuzha and handed it over to the Medical College management, to be used as teaching hospital for the medical students and Government Order No.G.O.(MS).263/73/HD dt. 23 October 1973 was issued accordingly. Thus this became the fourth Government Medical College in the state.

History

The initials T.D. stand for Thirumala Devaswom, which in Sanskrit means belonging to the Lord of Thirumala, since this medical college was started in 1963 under the patronage of the T.D. Temple at Anantha Narayana Puram of Alappuzha. Initially the management of the college was done by the Kerala Cultural & Educational Society. It was later brought under a trust called "T.D. Medical College Trust", which was headed by the President of the Thirumala Devaswom. The secretary of the trust was Sri. N. V. Prabhu, Thoppil House, Alappuzha. Sri. N. V. Prabhu was the main driving force and founder of the T. D. Medical College, Alappuzha. It is his brain child for he gave his heart and soul for building this private medical college, one of the first kind in the history of Kerala. The day-to-day administration of the college was done by the T.D. Medical College Administrative Council. A total of 145 acres of land was purchased at Vandanam, in the coastal belt for the future development of the college campus, to include the hospitals, hostels, residential quarters.

The construction of the building started with the foundation stone laying ceremony by R. Sankar, Chief Minister of Kerala on 6 March 1963 and the classes started in August 1963. Due to the objection raised by the Kerala University in running the medical college in this state collecting capitation fee from the students, the T.D.M.C. management ran into financial problems and the Kerala Government came forward for their help and took over the management of the institution from 17 October 1967 for a period of five years initially, under an agreement executed between the T.D. Medical College Trust and the Government. Since the T.D. Medical College Trust did not come forward to take back the management of the college at the end of the stipulated initial five-year period, as per conditions in the agreement, the college became vested with the Government of Kerala from 17 October 1972 and Government order No.G.O.M.S.263/73/HD dt. 23 October 1973 was issued accordingly. Thus this became the fourth Government Medical College in the state. Since no compensation whatsoever was paid to the T.D.M.C.Management by the Government during take over, the name T.D.Medical College is still retained in the records.

The number of seats for the M.B.B.S course in T.D. Medical College, Alappuzha was 50 to begin with. It was raised to 100 in 1967. But as per the recommendation of the Indian Medical Council, the number was again reduced to 80 in 1973. It was again raised to 100 as per the recommendation of the Indian Medical Council in 1979. Now the number of seats has raised to 150 from the academic year 2007-2008 onwards. Post Graduate Course in Medicine and Surgery (two seats each) were started in the year 1982-1983 and Paramedical Course for MLT was started in the year 1985–1986 with 15 seats. Diploma Course in Pharmacy was also started with 35 seats and later it increased to 40 seats.

In 1967 when the Government temporarily took over the management of the medical college there were only two wings of the college building in the ground floor constructed by the private management at a cost of about Rs.8.8 lakhs. The central portion housing the library in the ground floor and the auditorium in the first floor were constructed by the Government at a cost of about Rs.13 lakhs, which was completed in 1971. The construction of the remaining part of the first floor was done after the medical college was taken over by the Government. The regulations of the Medical Council of India demands the existence of Collegiate Hospital in Medical College Campus itself.  As part of the plan for shifting the Medical College Hospital to the College Campus, the following five departments were shifted to the newly constructed hospital building (now it is Old Block I & II)  at  Neerkunnam near Vandanam, on 25 February 1991: Psychiatry, Dermatology & Venereology, Radiotherapy, Physical Medicine and Rehabilitation, Dentistry.

In 2005, the Pediatrics department was shifted to the newly constructed A & B block of Medical College Hospital Complex Vandanam. In January 2007, Medicine and allied specialties have been shifted to new blocks such as D&E, I1, I2 IP wards at new hospital complex. After this, shifting process has been achieved tremendous pace. Within a span of three years, construction of three major blocks viz. C&F block, J1, J2, J3 diagnostic blocks and Surgical K blocks have been completed utilizing   NABARD and State Plan fund. On 12 January 2010, the Chief Minister of the state finally proclaimed that the shifting of the Medical College Hospital from Alappuzha to Vandanam was completed. Now the college and hospital are situated in a campus having an area of 162 acres and there is sufficient space for all types of future developments and there is a huge scope for developing this college as a Centre of Excellence in various fields of Modern Medicine.

Golden Jubilee celebrations
The President of India, Shri Pranab Mukherjee, inaugurated the Golden Jubilee celebration of the T D Medical College at Alappuzha in Kerala on 16 March 2013.

Departments
 Anaesthesiology
 Anatomy
 Biochemistry
 Cardio Thoracic Surgery
 Cardiology
 Community Medicine
 Dental
 Dermatology and Venerology
 Forensic Medicine
 Gastroenterology
 General Medicine
 General Surgery
 Genito Urinary Surgery
 Microbiology
 Nephrology
 Neurology
 Neuro Surgery
 Obstetrics & Gynaecology
 OMFS
 Ophthalmology
 Orthopaedics
 Otorhinolaryngology (E.N.T.)
 Paediatric Surgery
 Paediatrics
 Pathology
 Pharmacology
 Pharmacy
 Physical Education
 Physical medicine and rehabilitation
 Physiology
 Psychiatry
 Pulmonary Medicine
 Radiodiagnosis
 Radiotherapy
 Surgery
 Transfusion Medicine & Immunohaematology
 Urology

Courses offered
Main courses offered include MBBS ( 175 seats ), post-graduate training in basic specialties (M.D., MS and diploma courses) and super-specialities (DM and MCh), BDS, BSc Nursing, MSc Nursing in four specialities Maternal and Child Health Nursing, Medical Surgical Nursing, Child Health Nursing, Community Health Nursing and other paramedical courses.

Graduation
After completion of the courses, the medical and nursing colleges separately organize the graduation ceremonies. There has been no separate graduation ceremonies after the post graduation courses. The university does not have a part in these ceremonies since the legal ban on convocation ceremonies in the universities by the government.

See also
 Calicut Medical College
 Government Medical College, Thrissur
 Kollam ESIC Medical College Hospital
 Kottayam Medical College
 Trivandrum Medical College
 Government Medical College, Ernakulam

References

External links

 TDMC – Alappuzha
  

Medical colleges in Kerala
Alappuzha
Hospitals in Kerala
Universities and colleges in Alappuzha district
Buildings and structures in Alappuzha
Educational institutions established in 1963
1963 establishments in Kerala